C-C chemokine receptor type 7 is a protein that in humans is encoded by the CCR7 gene. Two ligands have been identified for this receptor: the chemokines (C-C motif) ligand 19 (CCL19/ELC) and (C-C motif) ligand 21 (CCL21). The ligands have similar affinity for the receptor, though CCL19 has been shown to induce internalisation of CCR7 and desensitisation of the cell to CCL19/CCL21 signals. CCR7 is a transmembrane protein with 7 transmembrane domains, which is coupled with heterotrimeric G proteins, which transduce the signal downstream through various signalling cascades. The main function of the receptor is to guide immune cells to immune organs (lymph nodes, thymus, spleen) by detecting specific chemokines, which these tissues secrete.

CCR7 has also recently been designated CD197 (cluster of differentiation 197).

Function 

The protein encoded by this gene is a member of the G protein-coupled receptor family. This receptor was identified as a gene induced by the Epstein–Barr virus (EBV), and is thought to be a mediator of EBV effects on B lymphocytes. As stated above, the receptor guides immune cells to immune organs such as lymph nodes, which is needed for the development of both resistance and tolerance, but it is also important for development of T cells in thymus. The receptor is expressed mostly on adaptive immune cell types, namely thymocytes, naive T and B cells, regulatory T cells, central memory lymphocytes, but also dendritic cells. CCR7 has been shown to stimulate dendritic cell maturation. CCR7 is also involved in homing of T cells to various secondary lymphoid organs such as lymph nodes and the spleen as well as trafficking of T cells within the spleen.

CCR7 in dendritic cells 

CCR7´s function is best studied in dendritic cells. Their activation in peripheral tissues induces CCR7 expression on the cell's surface, which recognize CCL19 and CCL21 produced in the Lymph node and increases dendritic cell expression of co-stimulation molecules (B7), and MHC class I or MHC class II. CCR7 signalling was also found to affect chemotaxis, actin dynamics but also survival of dendritic cells, though all of the mentioned functions are induced by different independent signalling pathways. Chemotaxis is regulated by MAPK pathway and surprisignly is independent of CCR7 signalling pathway regulating actin dynamics. Executive components of this cascade are kinases MEK1/2, ERK1/2, p38, JNK and perhaps others. The executive kinases phosphorylate transcription factors and other regulators thereby changing expresison profile of the cell. Increased cellular survival upon CCR7 ligation stems from both pro-apoptotic molecules inhibition and survival promoting proteins stimulation as the receptor is known to activate the PI3K/AKT/mTOR pathway The effector molecules of this pathway are mTOR and NFkB, collectively the effect is exerted via anti-apoptotic Bcl2 proteins expression and inhibition of pro-apoptotic proteins GSK3B, FOXO1/3 and 4EBP1. CCR7 affects cellular actin dynamics via the RhoA/cofilin pathway.

Influence of CCR7 on central tolerance 

CCR7 has been shown to be important for the selection process of T cells in thymus and its morphology formation. Experiments in mouse models have shown that mice lacking CCR7 had fewer thymocytes during development and more frequent autoimmune disorders. It is believed, that CCR7 takes part in homing of lymphoid progenitors to thymus, but also in thymocyte transition from thymic cortex to medulla. Once double negative thymocyte (first step of T cell development) undergoes positive selection, it becomes double positive (expressing both CD4 and CD8 coreceptors) and starts to express CCR7, which guides it to thymic medulla, where negative selection takes place. ccr7 knockout mice have leaky negative selection are prone autoimmune disorders. The mechanism is thought to be both thymus morphology disruption and insufficient T cell receptor stimulation  It must however be noted that CCR7 affects not only central tolerance, but also peripheral tolerance by allowing homing of tolerogenic dendritic cells to lymph nodes.

Clinical significance 

CCR7 is expressed by various cancer cells, such as nonsmall lung cancer, gastric cancer and oesophageal cancer. Expression of CCR7, usually with VEGF family proteins, by cancer cells is linked with metastasis and generally poorer prognosis. Multiple mechanisms through which CCR7 expression changes the prognosis of cancer patients have been discovered. As described above on the example of dendritic cells, CCR7 enhances survival of the cell and enables it to migrate following CCL19/CCL21 gradient, which leads to lymph nodes, in addition to that it has been shown that CCR7 ligation promotes EMT transition, which is cruicial for metastasis, as it allows cells to detach and migrate. Also CCR7 signalling induces VEGF-C and VEGF-D molecules, which promote lymphoneogenesis around the tumour.

References

External links

Further reading 

 
 
 
 
 
 
 
 
 
 
 
 
 
 
 
 
 
 
 
 
 
 
 
 
 

Chemokine receptors
Clusters of differentiation